In the first 36 years of its existence, the NSW Railways introduced 42 separate classes of locomotives. The appointment by the Premier of New South Wales, Henry Parkes of Mr E.M.G Eddy as Chief Commissioner in 1888 created an independent railway department and saw the following 36 years with only sixteen new classes produced.

Classification
Steam Locomotive classification on the New South Wales Government Railways had three distinct classification systems.

From 1855 to 1890 (numerical)
The classification was taken from the road number given to the first engine in each class.

The engines attached to the then isolated Northern section had the terminal letter "N" added to the road number.

From October 1890 to August 1924 (letter and number)
A letter was selected arbitrarily and placed before the first number allotted to each class. e.g. the 93-class became the A.93-class. Letters were initially allocated, in alphabetic order, by class size.  The 93 Class had the most locomotives in traffic (77) so they were given the letter 'A', the 205 Class were the next most numerous (70 in traffic), so were classified 'B', the 79 Class the third most numerous (68 in service) so were granted the letter 'C' and so on.  With the opening of the Hawkesbury Bridge in May 1889, the Northern section engines were renumbered and grouped with the others of the Sydney system, using the numbers 388-435. the final "N" being dropped .

In general practice, the class letter only was quoted, without the number, except when there were one or two variants using a common class-letter.

From August 1924 (letter and number)
All engines were given new four-figure numbers, the first two digits indicating the class and the second two, the engine number, arranged in chronological order of commencement of service. When the number of engines in a class exceeded 99, 100 was added to the number, e.g., the 137th engine of the 32-class was 3337.  Engines numbered from 1000 up were the first to be renumbered using the new system to prevent two locomotives sharing the same number being in service at the same time.

The initial letters indicate :
 "C"-three driving axles;
 "D"-four driving axles;
 "AD"-two articulated sets of four driving axles (Only for the AD60s);
 "Z"-old classes which would never be repeated, and
 "X" -associated with the 10-class, which included all types of duplicates; yard and depot locomotives, crane locomotives, locomotive and accident cranes and special equipment.

Initial letters are dropped in general usage with a "C.36-class" engine universally known as a "36-class".

Classes

See also
 Preserved steam locomotives of New South Wales

References 

Steam locomotives of New South Wales
Locomotive classification systems
Railway locomotive-related lists